Antillotrecha is a genus of ammotrechid camel spiders, first described by Luis de Armas in 1994.

Species 
, the World Solifugae Catalog accepts the following four species:

 Antillotrecha disjunctodens Armas & Teruel, 2005 — Cuba
 Antillotrecha fraterna Armas, 1994 — Dominican Republic
 Antillotrecha guama Armas & Teruel, 2005 — Cuba
 Antillotrecha iviei Armas, 2002 — Anguilla

References 

Arachnid genera
Solifugae